Vivian Reed (born June 6, 1947) is an American actor and singer. She is most known for her performances in the Broadway productions of Bubbling Brown Sugar for which she won a Drama Desk Award and received her first Tony Award nomination and for "The High Rollers Social and Pleasure Club" for which she received her second Tony Award nomination. Reed has also recorded several albums on the Epic Records and the United Artists Records labels.

Early life and career
Vivian Reed began formal voice training at the age of eight at the Pittsburgh Musical Institute, later continuing at New York's Juilliard School of Music, followed by years of extensive dance training. She became a polished performer under the guidance of Honi Coles and Bobby Schiffman of the Apollo Theater. In 1968, she had regionally popularized a Gerry Goffin and Carole King composed tune called "Yours Until Tomorrow", which achieved some success. She received critical acclaim for her work in Bubbling Brown Sugar on Broadway and Europe. She captured the attention of Pierre Cardin, who booked her into his theater and held her over for several weeks.  Through Cardin she went to Japan for the first time and later made her first European television special. Later, she was invited by the Prince and Princess of Monaco to perform in Monte Carlo.

Television
She has appeared on many television variety and talk shows, both nationally and internationally, including The Tonight Show, The Today Show and the ABC-TV daytime drama, One Life to Live. She has shared the bill with Bill Cosby, Patti LaBelle, Brian Stokes Mitchell, Audra McDonald, Elaine Stritch, Alan King, Sammy Davis Jr., Quincy Jones, Ashford & Simpson, Charles Aznavour and others. Her film credits include Headin' for Broadway, L'Africain with Catherine Deneuve and La Rumba, in which she portrayed Josephine Baker. She produced and starred in a short film, 'What Goes Around' written by Angela Gibbs. She has also done voiceover work and television commercials.

Fashion
Reed has been featured in Vogue, Elle, Paris Match, People, Ebony, and the covers of Jet and Time magazines. She was named on Mr. Blackwell's Best Dressed Women List and selected by People magazine as one of the '25 Most Intriguing People of the Year.' She is a professional photographer and scarf designer. Her line is called VJR scarves.

Theatre
She appeared in Sophisticated Ladies, The Roar of the Greasepaint - The Smell of the Crowd, Blues in the Night, Don't Bother Me, I Can't Cope, High Rollers, Show Boat, in which she portrayed the role of "Queenie" and Tintypes. She has also appeared in Blues for an Alabama Sky, Crumbs from the Table of Joy and Pork Pie and Cookin' at the Cookery. She was featured in Marie Christine at Lincoln Center and portrayed Lena Horne in a new piece, More Than a Song, with the Pittsburgh Ballet at the Benedum Theater in Pittsburgh. She appeared in the Lena Horne Awards Show hosted by Bill Cosby, honoring Rosie O'Donnell and with Quincy Jones at the Ford Center for the Performing Arts in New York and appeared in Three Mo' Divas, the follow-up to Three Mo Tenors''' at the San Diego Repertory Theatre and Arena Stage in Washington, DC. She also played "Gloria Franklin" in The Second Tosca, written by Tom Rowan. She has been performing her one-woman shows to sold out houses and concluded two book musical workshops, One For My Baby and The Countess of Storyville''. She has created four one-woman shows.

Music
Reed's nightclub act has appeared at events for Mercedes Benz, IBM, Top Fashion Designers Gala at the Théâtre des Champs-Élysées and the American Film Festival in Deauville. She appeared at the Viña del Mar International Song Festival in Chile and received the coveted 'Torch Award,' an honor bestowed by the mayor and citizens of Viña. She has also made six albums.

Honors and awards
Reed awards or nominations include two Tony Awards, a Drama Desk Award, Theatre World Award, Outer Critics Circle Award, Dance Education of America Award, NAACP Award, Mabel Mercer, Adelco, Torch Award from South American song festival and others. In 2014, she received the 'Kingdom of Excellence Award' an honor bestowed by Dr. Michelle Harris, CEO of Vindicated Magazine for her lifetime of achievements.

Teaching
Reed taught at the Berklee College of Music in Boston. While there she established an annual concert event called "Singer's Night." She is a vocal professor on the staff of Marymount Manhattan College in New York City.

External links

References

Living people
20th-century African-American women singers
Drama Desk Award winners
African-American actresses
American musical theatre actresses
1947 births
21st-century African-American people
21st-century African-American women
Actresses from Pittsburgh
Singers from Pennsylvania